Bolshoye Nagatkino is a rural locality (a selo) and the administrative center of Tsilninsky District, Ulyanovsk Oblast, Russia. Population:

References

Notes

Sources

Rural localities in Ulyanovsk Oblast
Simbirsky Uyezd